= Sin Chow-Yiu =

Sin Chow-Yiu is the Hon-Yin and Suet-Fong Chan Professor in Chinese and the Head of Department of Chinese at the University of Hong Kong. He is also the Chief Editor of the Journal of Oriental Studies.
